Chloridea tergemina is a species of moth of the family Noctuidae. It is found in South America, including Brazil.

The larvae feed on various solanaceaeous plants.

The species was formerly a member of the genus Heliothis, but was moved to the reinstated genus Chloridea as a result of genetic and morphological research published in 2013.

References

External links

Noctuídeos (Lepidoptera, Noctuidae) Do Museu Entomológico Ceslau Biezanko, Departamento De Fitossanidade, Faculdade De Agronomia “Eliseu Maciel”, Universidade Federal De Pelotas, RS

Heliothis